Dijon Kameri (born 20 April 2004) is an Austrian professional footballer who plays as a midfielder for Austrian Bundesliga club Red Bull Salzburg.

Career 
Kameri began his career at FC Liefering. Between 2016 and 2017 he played for the youth of the partner club FC Red Bull Salzburg for a short time before moving to the Red Bull Salzburg academy for the 2018/19 season. After three years at the academy, he moved to the professional squad of the farm team s FC Liefering for the 2021/22 season.

His debut for Liefering in the 2. Liga he gave in July 2021, when he was in the starting line-up on the first day of that season against Kapfenberger SV.

International career
Born in Austria, Kameri is of Kosovo-Albanian descent. He is a youth international for Austria.

Career statistics

Club

Notes

References

2004 births
Living people
Footballers from Burgenland
Austrian footballers
Austria youth international footballers
Austrian people of Kosovan descent
Association football midfielders
2. Liga (Austria) players
FC Red Bull Salzburg players
FC Liefering players
Austrian Football Bundesliga players